The 1999 Food City 500 was the seventh stock car race of the 1999 NASCAR Winston Cup Series season and the 39th iteration of the event. The race was held on Sunday, April 11, 1999, in Bristol, Tennessee at Bristol Motor Speedway, a 0.533 miles (0.858 km) permanent oval-shaped racetrack. The race took the scheduled 500 laps to complete. At race's end, Penske-Kranefuss Racing driver Rusty Wallace would dominate most of the race to take home his 49th career NASCAR Winston Cup Series victory and his only win of the season. To fill out the podium, Roush Racing driver Mark Martin and Robert Yates Racing driver Dale Jarrett would finish second and third, respectively.

Background 

The Bristol Motor Speedway, formerly known as Bristol International Raceway and Bristol Raceway, is a NASCAR short track venue located in Bristol, Tennessee. Constructed in 1960, it held its first NASCAR race on July 30, 1961. Despite its short length, Bristol is among the most popular tracks on the NASCAR schedule because of its distinct features, which include extraordinarily steep banking, an all concrete surface, two pit roads, and stadium-like seating. It has also been named one of the loudest NASCAR tracks.

Entry list 

 (R) denotes rookie driver.

Practice

First practice 
The first practice session was held on Friday, April 9, at 11:00 AM EST. The session would last for two hours and 25 minutes.

Second practice 
The second practice session was held on Friday, April 9, at 1:15 PM EST. The session would last for 45 minutes.

Third practice 
The third practice session was held on Saturday, April 10, at 9:30 AM EST. The session would last for one hour.

Final practice 
The final practice session, sometimes referred to as Happy Hour, was held on Saturday, April 10, after the preliminary 1999 Moore's Snacks 250. The session would last for one hour.

Qualifying 
Qualifying was split into two rounds. The first round was held on Friday, April 9, at 3:00 PM EST. Each driver would have two laps to set a fastest time; the fastest of the two would count as their official qualifying lap. During the first round, the top 25 drivers in the round would be guaranteed a starting spot in the race. If a driver was not able to guarantee a spot in the first round, they had the option to scrub their time from the first round and try and run a faster lap time in a second round qualifying run, held on Saturday, April 10, at 11:30 AM EST. As with the first round, each driver would have two laps to set a fastest time; the fastest of the two would count as their official qualifying lap. Positions 26-36 would be decided on time, while positions 37-43 would be based on provisionals. Six spots are awarded by the use of provisionals based on owner's points. The seventh is awarded to a past champion who has not otherwise qualified for the race. If no past champion needs the provisional, the next team in the owner points will be awarded a provisional.

Three drivers would fail to qualify: Rich Bickle, Stanton Barrett, and Derrike Cope.

Full qualifying results 

*Time not available.

Race results

References 

1999 NASCAR Winston Cup Series
NASCAR races at Bristol Motor Speedway
April 1999 sports events in the United States
1999 in sports in Tennessee